

Seeds

  Mariusz Fyrstenberg  /  Marcin Matkowski  (quarterfinals)
  Marcelo Melo /   André Sá (champions)
  Marcel Granollers  /  Bruno Soares (first round)
  František Čermák  /  Michal Mertiňák (quarterfinals)

Draw

External links
Doubles Draw

Doubles